Bidoli Sadat is a small village in the Shamli district), Uttar Pradesh, India.

References

Villages in Shamli district